Quebec's Route 389 connects Route 138 adjacent to Baie-Comeau with the Newfoundland and Labrador border, connecting with the Trans-Labrador Highway (Newfoundland and Labrador provincial route 500) to Wabush and Labrador City, and beyond to Goose Bay. On its way it skirts the eastern shore of Manicouagan Reservoir.

Route description 

The Québec North Shore Company and Hydro-Québec completed portions from Route 389 to the Manic 5 hydroelectric project site (km 213), now known as the Daniel-Johnson Dam.

From km 213, the highway follows a path traditionally used by aboriginal people and explorers, with access to the Hart Jaune Hydroelectric Complex at km 390. The town of Gagnon, now torn down, was at km 394.

From km 317 (gas station and restaurant), the highway is now paved all the way to km 495.

Starting at km 495, the "Fire Lake Mine Road" section was built by unemployed workers during a labour dispute, influenced by the presence of the railway owned by the Québec Cartier Mining Company. This section of unpaved road is notoriously known as "the trail."

From km 495 to the provincial border at km 567 (352 miles from Baie-Comeau), the road is an accident-prone section notorious for its poor surface and sharp curves (the joke being one can see their own taillights). Local citizens in adjacent Labrador have been urging realignment of this road, a vital work if it were to be the routing of a fixed link to Newfoundland.

On April 9, 2009, the Quebec government announced that $438 million would be spent for work to improve the highway from the south end as far as Fermont, with major upgrading and repair work. This will include a significant reroute in the Fire Lake-Mont-Wright section far to the southeast between approximately km 508 and km 564, rejoining the existing route by way of the Fermont access road and no longer routing through Mont-Wright.  Work is expected to take fully 10 years, although planning of improvements to this northernmost section began almost immediately. The Comprehensive Study Report is now complete, and comments were accepted until Oct. 4, 2018.

The bridge over the Pékans River (around km 550) is a popular starting point for canoe trips down the Moisie River.

At km 564 is the town of Fermont, a mining town with a population of 2,918, and last Quebec port-of-call before entering Newfoundland and Labrador. Labrador City is 21 km further along what is now Highway 500, Wabush is 6 km south east of that on Highway 503 (which ends in Wabush). The Happy Valley-Goose Bay ferry terminal is located 526 km east of Wabush, along the shores of Lake Melville, with access to the Atlantic Ocean. The Labrador City/Fermont area border crossing is roughly the half-way point of the approximately 16-hour drive between the junction of Routes 138 and 389 in Baie-Comeau and the end of Route 500 (and adjunct Route 520) in Happy Valley – Goose Bay, Newfoundland and Labrador.

Details

The road alternates between asphalt and gravel, as shown below:

Section 1: Baie-Comeau to Manic-5 

Distance:                        213 kmType of surface:            asphalt: narrow and twistyApprox. Driving Time:    2 h 30 minSpeed Limit:          70 to 90 km/h

No services until Manic-5, which has basic automotive services

Section 2: Manic-5 to Relais-Gabriel 

Distance:                        104 kmType of surface:           Gravel: bad condition, narrow and twistyApprox. Driving Time:   1 h 30 minSpeed Limit:        70 km/h

No services until Relais-Gabriel, which has basic automotive services and restaurant

Section 3: Relais-Gabriel to Gagnon* 

Distance:                        77 kmType of surface:            asphaltApprox. Driving Time:    1 h 00 minSpeed Limit:           90 km/h

No services until Fermont

The town of Gagnon was closed in 1985.

Section 4: Gagnon to Fire Lake 

Distance:                         101 kmType of surface:           asphalt, bad conditionApprox. Driving Time:     1 h 15 minSpeed Limit:            90 km/h

Section 5: Fire Lake to Mont-Wright 

Distance:                           67 km Type of surface:               gravel: bad condition, very narrow and twistyApprox. Driving Time:       1 h 00 minSpeed Limit:             70 km/h

No services until Fermont. Note that the railway crosses the road numerous times.
Bids are being solicited for reconstruction over the next four years.

Section 6: Mont-Wright to Fermont 

Distance:                           17 kmType of surface:               asphalt, good conditionApprox. Driving Time:      0 h 10 minSpeed Limit:                            90 km/h

No services until Fermont

Section 7: Fermont to Interprovincial Border 

Distance:                           3 kmType of surface:               asphalt, good conditionApprox. Driving Time:      0 h 5 minSpeed Limit:             90 km/h

Fermont has full automotive, food and hospitality services; next services in Labrador City, 17 km from border, 20 km from Fermont

Municipalities along Route 389
The road passes through the following municipalities and unorganized territories from south to north:
 Baie-Comeau
 Rivière-aux-Outardes
 Rivière-Mouchalagane
 Fermont

See also
 List of Quebec provincial highways

References

External links 

Provincial Route Map (Courtesy of the Quebec Ministry of Transportation) 
Route 389 on Google Maps
Trans-Labrador Highway - Virtual Tour: Quebec Hwy 389 - Baie Comeau to Labrador City

389
Baie-Comeau